Shin Hyo-seob (born May 3, 1992), professionally known as Crush, is a South Korean R&B and hip hop singer-songwriter and producer. Crush often uses Jazz musical instruments in his style of music, implementing modern tunes. He debuted on April 1, 2014, with the single "Sometimes" and released his first album Crush on You on June 5, 2014.

Thirteen of Crush's singles have peaked in the top ten on the Gaon Digital Chart, with nine of Crush's singles also becoming top five hits including "Just", "Beautiful", "Don't Forget", "Bittersweet" and "Sleepness Night".

Life and career

Early life and career beginnings
Crush was born Shin Hyo-seob on May 3, 1992. Raised in Seoul, he began listening to R&B and hip hop music at a young age and aspired to become a singer. Dynamic Duo's debut album Taxi Driver left a "deep impression" on him, which inspired him to begin rapping. He began making music during his first year of middle school with a friend and sending demos to the group's record label Amoeba Culture. Nicknamed "Shi Syeob", he wrote the moniker "C-sub" in English as a tentative stage name. His friend misread it as "Crush", which he took an immediate liking to and decided to use. Crush attended Hoseo University and graduated from the Department of Practical Music.

While taking a break from school, Crush sent Zion.T his demos after meeting at a hip hop party. The two became acquainted and, along with Gray, Loco, and Elo, formed the music crew VV:D in 2012.

Crush released the single "Red Dress" featuring TakeOne on December 7, 2012. He contributed to his first song as a record producer and guest artist on Loco's single "No More". In the following year, he released the singles "Crush on You" and "Where Do You Wanna Go" with Taewan and Gary. In July 2013, Crush signed an exclusive contract with Amoeba Culture.

2014–2015: Debut and rising popularity 
Crush officially debuted on April 1, 2014, with a single titled "Sometimes". His first album, Crush on You, was released on June 5, 2014, and went on to win Best R&B & Soul Album at the 12th Korean Music Awards. In 2014, Crush also collaborated with Gaeko for the single "Hug Me". In August, he sang the OST "Sleepless Night" for the SBS drama It's Okay, That's Love. In October, Crush released the track "Sofa".

In 2015, Crush collaborated with Zion.T for the single "Just". The song was released on January 30, 2015, and debuted at number one on the Gaon Singles Chart. Crush and Zion.T won Best Collaboration at the 17th Mnet Asian Music Awards. In July, Crush released the single "Oasis" which featured Block B's Zico. In November, Crush held his first solo concert, Crush on You.

2016–2018: Breakthrough and widespread recognition 

In January 2016, Crush released the single "Don't Forget" featuring Girls' Generation's Taeyeon. "Don't Forget" won first place on Show Champion on January 27, marking his first music show win. Crush also went on to win Best Vocal Performance - Male Solo at the 18th Mnet Asian Music Awards.

In 2016, Crush became an active member of the hip-hop crew Fanxy Child, consisting of Zico (rapper, producer), Dean (singer, producer), Penomeco (rapper), Millic (DJ, producer), Staytuned (producer).

In July 2018, Crush released his third extended play Wonderlost. As with his previous projects, Crush was heavily involved in the songwriting, composition, and production of his album, stating: “I’m able to do the full production… I can make my own arrangements, and oversee the entire process.”

In December 2016, Crush also released the hit OST “Beautiful” for the tvN drama Guardian: The Lonely and Great God, and later received a nomination for Best OST at the 19th Mnet Asian Music Awards.

2019: Second full-length album and continued popularity 
On June 4, 2019, Crush stated on his Instagram that he would be leaving Amoeba Records to start his own agency. However, on July 17, 2019, he announced that he had decided to sign with Psy's agency, P Nation. On December 5, 2019, Crush released his critically acclaimed second full-length album From Midnight To Sunrise, with "Alone" and "With You" serving as the album's double lead singles. Crush once again took control of songwriting and production for the album, and introduced jazz elements alongside R&B. From Midnight To Sunrise won R&B Album of the Year at the Korean Hip-hop Awards.

In February 2020, Crush released the OST "Let Us Go" for the televisionn series Crash Landing on You. In May 2020, it was announced that Crush had asked Joy of Red Velvet to feature on the lead single of his next album. The song, titled "Mayday", topped multiple music charts upon its release. On October 20, 2020, Crush released his fourth extended play With Her.

On October 31, 2022, P Nation announced that the opening of tickets reservations for Crush's upcoming tour, the Crush on You Tour, would be postponed to respect the mourning period established after the Seoul Halloween crowd crush.

Personal life 
On November 12, 2020, Crush enlisted for his mandatory military service. On August 11, 2022, Crush was discharged from his military service.

On August 23, 2021, Crush was confirmed to be in a relationship with singer and actress Joy, whom he had collaborated with during the previous year.

Discography

Studio albums

Extended plays

Singles

As lead artist

As featured artist

Soundtrack appearances

Other charted songs

Filmography

Television shows

Awards and nominations

References

External links

1992 births
21st-century South Korean singers
Hoseo University alumni
Living people
MAMA Award winners
Place of birth missing (living people)
Singers from Seoul
South Korean hip hop singers